Ida Kathrine Karstoft (born 29 October 1995) is a Danish athlete. She competed in the women's 4 × 100 metres relay event at the 2019 World Athletics Championships. Karstoft won the bronze medal in the 200 metres at the 2022 European Championships.

Her career as an athlete started as a soccer player in the Danish league, even being selected for two matches for the national Danish Women's soccer team. But during a period of injury her sprinting abilities were discovered during running practice and she transitioned to traditional athletics.

References

External links
 
 Ida Karstoft - statletik.eu

1995 births
Living people
Danish female sprinters
Danish women's footballers
Place of birth missing (living people)
World Athletics Championships athletes for Denmark
Athletes (track and field) at the 2020 Summer Olympics
Olympic athletes of Denmark
21st-century Danish women
European Athletics Championships medalists
Women's association footballers not categorized by position